Hypsilurus schoedei, Vogt's forest dragon, is a species of agama found in Papua New Guinea.

References

Hypsilurus
Taxa named by Theodor Vogt
Reptiles described in 1932
Agamid lizards of New Guinea